The following list includes all of the Canadian Register of Historic Places listings in Surrey, British Columbia.

Surrey
Surrey, British Columbia